The Progressive Agricultural Democratic Union (abbr. ΠΑΔΕ (PADE)) was a coalition of four Greek political parties for the elections of 1958.

Its main leader was Alexandros Baltatzis. Members to the coalition were:
 Peasants and Workers Party
 Progressive Party
 National Progressive Center Union
 Democratic Party of Working People

See also
List of political parties in Greece

Defunct political party alliances in Greece
Political parties established in 1958
1958 establishments in Greece